Raghava Nagar is a residential area within Madipakkam, a southern suburb of Chennai (formerly known as Madras), in Tamil Nadu, India. It is very near Moovarsampet Tank and mount. There is a welfare association which conducts elections yearly.

Kalimagal Mat Hr. Sec School is placed in the First Main Road, in the same road you can find Kaliyangudi Hotel.

Bus Stop : Koot Road
MRTS Station : St. Thomas Mount, velachery

External links
https://web.archive.org/web/20071010181736/http://www.madipakkam.com/photogallery/temple.gif
https://web.archive.org/web/20071010181710/http://www.madipakkam.com/photogallery/lake.gif
http://madippakkam.blogspot.com

Raghava Nagar has eight roads and two main roads.

Neighbourhoods in Chennai